The Jack Kane Show was a Canadian music variety television series which aired on CBC Television from 1960 to 1961.

Premise
The series featured the big band music of Jack Kane and was a continuation of his episodes from Music '60, with less elaborate production. Vocalist Sylvia Murphy and Kane's band were the series regulars.

Scheduling
This half-hour series was broadcast Mondays at 8:30 p.m. (Eastern) from 26 September 1960 to 3 April 1961.

Steve Lawrence and Andy Williams were among the visiting performers.

References

External links
 

CBC Television original programming
1960 Canadian television series debuts
1961 Canadian television series endings
1960s Canadian variety television series